George Rayner (15 October 1863 – 20 February 1915) was a New Zealand cricketer. He played in seven first-class cricket matches for Canterbury and Otago between 1884 and 1890. 

Rayner's highest first-class score was 49 not out, the highest score of the match, batting at No. 9 for Canterbury when they defeated Otago by 10 wickets in February 1887. A year later, playing for Otago, he made 11 and 33, the second-highest score of the match, when Otago beat Canterbury by 103 runs. 

Rayner married Lizzie Lane in Ashburton in December 1892. They lived in Christchurch, where he worked as a bootmaker. In 1908 he became the publican of the Shades Hotel in Hereford Street, Christchurch. He died in Christchurch in February 1915, aged 51. His wife died in November 1941, survived by their daughter.

See also
 List of Otago representative cricketers

References

External links
 

1863 births
1915 deaths
New Zealand cricketers
Canterbury cricketers
Otago cricketers
Cricketers from Northampton
English emigrants to New Zealand